The Breskens Pocket was a pocket of fortified German resistance against the Canadian First Army in the Battle of the Scheldt during the Second World War. It was chiefly situated on the southern shore of the Scheldt estuary in the southern Netherlands, near the Belgian border. It was named after the town of Breskens, which was later freed from German occupation during Operation Switchback.

Order Of Battle

Allied Forces
Canadian First Army
 3rd Canadian Division
 4th Canadian Division

Axis Forces
15th Army (Wehrmacht)
 64th Infantry Division

</ref>

External links
Veterans Affairs Canada

Military history of Canada during World War II
1944 in the Netherlands
Battles in Zeeland
Sluis